Etdrick S. Bohannon (born May 29, 1973) is an American former professional basketball player. He played in the NBA, among other leagues.

Born in San Bernardino, California, Bohannon attended the University of Arizona for one year, the University of Tennessee, and Auburn University Montgomery. He played four seasons in the NBA for five different teams (from 1997—2001). Though not drafted by an NBA team, he was selected in the CBA draft in 1997, by the Rockford Lightning. In 2001, he signed his first contract abroad, for helping Spanish team Gijón Baloncesto to avoid the relegation to the second league.

In 2005, he played for the Yakama Sun Kings of the CBA.

References

External links
Player profile @ NBA.com

1973 births
Living people
African-American basketball players
American expatriate basketball people in Spain
American men's basketball players
Arizona Wildcats men's basketball players
Auburn Montgomery Warhawks men's basketball players
Basketball players from California
Cleveland Cavaliers players
Forwards (basketball)
Gijón Baloncesto players
Indiana Pacers players
Liga ACB players
Los Angeles Clippers players
New York Knicks players
Sportspeople from San Bernardino, California
Sioux Falls Skyforce (CBA) players
Tennessee Volunteers basketball players
Undrafted National Basketball Association players
Washington Wizards players
Yakama Sun Kings players
21st-century African-American sportspeople
20th-century African-American sportspeople